Romina Oprandi was the defending champion, but chose not to participate. 
Anna Tatishvili defeating Arantxa Rus in the final 6–4, 6–3.

Seeds

Main draw

Finals

Top half

Bottom half

References
 Main Draw
 Qualifying Draw

International Country Cuneo - Singles